Review of Books' may refer to:

Caribbean Review of Books
Claremont Review of Books
Jewish Review of Books
London Review of Books
Los Angeles Review of Books
The New York Review of Books
The New York Times Book Review
San Francisco Review of Books
Scottish Review of Books
Shanghai Review of Books

See also
Book Review (disambiguation)